Zachary Johnson is the drummer of The Cinematic Underground.  He is also Katie Chastain's drummer, and he was the drummer for The Fray before he quit the band to become an actor.  Zachary is also a visual artist and his work has been featured on various album covers and film posters. In 2009 Johnson completed an alternate poster for The Brothers Bloom which featured his signature pen and ink moleskin drawings.

External links
Zachary's Blog
The Cinematic Underground

American rock drummers
Living people
Year of birth missing (living people)